Gbèhounou Louis Vlavonou (born 1953) is a Beninese politician who is the current President of the National Assembly.

He is a member of the Progressive Union party. He has been a Member of Parliament since 2003 before being elected president of the National Assembly of Benin on 17 May 2019 with 78 votes, 1 against and 3 abstentions.

References

Living people
Presidents of the National Assembly (Benin)
Members of the National Assembly (Benin)
Progressive Union (Benin) politicians
1953 births